Alain Álvarez Menéndez (born 13 November 1989) is a Spanish professional footballer who plays for UP Langreo as a central defender.

Club career
Born in Gijón, Asturias, Álvarez joined Sporting de Gijón's youth setup in 2004, aged 14, after starting out at Veriña CF. He made his senior debut with the reserves in 2006, in Tercera División.

In the summer of 2009, Álvarez was called up by manager Manolo Preciado for the pre-season with the main squad. However, he continued to be exclusively associated to the B-team in competitive games.

On 18 July 2014, Álvarez moved abroad for the first time in his career, joining Cypriot First Division side Othellos Athienou FC. He played his first match as a professional on 30 August, starting in a 0–1 home loss against Nea Salamis Famagusta FC.

Álvarez returned to his native country on 8 July 2015, signing a two-year deal with Racing de Santander. He moved back to Cyprus the following off-season, with Aris Limassol FC.

References

External links

1989 births
Living people
Footballers from Gijón
Spanish footballers
Association football defenders
Segunda División B players
Tercera División players
Sporting de Gijón B players
Racing de Santander players
SD Leioa players
UP Langreo footballers
Cypriot First Division players
Othellos Athienou F.C. players
Aris Limassol FC players
Spain youth international footballers
Spanish expatriate footballers
Expatriate footballers in Cyprus
Spanish expatriate sportspeople in Cyprus